Portkey Games is a video game label owned by Warner Bros. Games founded in 2017 and dedicated to creating gaming experiences related to the Wizarding World.

Overview
Portkey Games first announced their first game in 2017, working with Pokémon Go creators Niantic to produce a game known as Harry Potter: Wizards Unite. The game would feature the same augmented reality as in Pokémon Go but use characters from the Harry Potter universe.

Later in 2017, before the release of Wizards Unite, Portkey Games also announced a second mobile game in development, called Harry Potter: Hogwarts Mystery. Hogwarts Mystery allows users to play as a Hogwarts student and is set before the events of the Harry Potter series. The game was released exclusively for iOS and Android on April 25, 2018. Portkey Games then released two more mobile games: Harry Potter: Puzzles & Spells in 2020 and Harry Potter: Magic Awakened in 2021.

In 2023, Portkey Games released Hogwarts Legacy, an action role-playing game developed by Avalanche Software. The game is set in the late 1800s and takes place in several Wizarding World locations. Legacy has achieved success shortly after its debut, selling 12 million copies and generating $850 million in sales globally within two weeks. It also broke company records for Warner Bros. Games in terms of player engagement, reaching 280 million hours played.

Releases

References

External links
 Official website

British companies established in 2017
Video game companies established in 2017
Video game development companies
Video game companies of the United Kingdom
Warner Bros. Games
2017 establishments in England
British subsidiaries of foreign companies